Riding for Germany is a 1941 German drama film directed by Arthur Maria Rabenalt and starring Willy Birgel, Gertrud Eysoldt and Gerhild Weber. A German cavalry officer, badly injured during the First World War, emerges as a leading competitor in post-war equestrian events.

Cast

References

External links

Films of Nazi Germany
German sports drama films
1940s sports drama films
Films about horses
Horse sports in film
Films directed by Arthur Maria Rabenalt
Films set in 1918
Films set in the 1920s
UFA GmbH films
German black-and-white films
1941 drama films
1940s German-language films
1940s German films